Christian Pastina (born 15 February 2001) is an Italian professional football player who plays for Benevento Calcio.

Club career 
Christian Pastina made his Serie A debut for Benevento Calcio on the 9 January 2021.

References

External links

2001 births
Living people
Italian footballers
Association football defenders
People from Battipaglia
Benevento Calcio players
Serie A players
Serie B players
Sportspeople from the Province of Salerno
Footballers from Campania